Michael Marks ( Polish: Michał Marks; 1859? – 31 December 1907) was a businessman and entrepreneur, who with Thomas Spencer co-founded the British retail chain Marks & Spencer.

Biography
Marks was born into a Polish Ashkenazi Jewish family in Słonim, in what was then the multinational Russian Empire (now Grodno Region, Belarus). He emigrated to England around 1882 and moved to Leeds, where a company called Barran was known to employ Jewish immigrants. He married Hannah Cohen at the Great Synagogue on Belgrave Street, Leeds, in 1886. The year on his naturalisation papers say 1859, but his age on his marriage certificate suggests a later year, perhaps 1863 or 1864.

Marks met Isaac Dewhirst, the owner of a Leeds warehouse, in 1884. A deal was arranged, whereby Marks agreed to buy goods from Dewhirst and sell them in nearby villages. The venture was a success and enabled Marks to raise enough capital to establish a stall in Leeds' open market. At his stall, he used the slogan "Don't Ask the Price – it's a Penny". He also sold goods at Castleford and Wakefield markets.

Marks also made the decision to rent an area at the new covered market in Leeds, which traded six days of the week.  Over the next few years, Marks expanded his business and opened similar stalls in covered market halls all over Yorkshire and Lancashire.

Marks & Spencer
In 1894, Marks decided that if he was to expand the business further, he would need a business partner. He initially approached Isaac Dewhirst, who decided against the offer but suggested that his cashier Thomas Spencer might be interested. Spencer decided that the £300 required for a half-share in the business would be a good investment.

The running of the business was split between Spencer, who managed the office and warehouse, and Marks, who continued to run the market stalls. Spencer had developed some important contacts while working for Isaac Dewhirst, and these allowed him to get the best prices for goods by dealing directly with the manufacturers. Together, Spencer and Marks were able to open stores in Manchester, Birmingham, Liverpool, Middlesbrough, Sheffield, Bristol, Hull, Sunderland and Cardiff.

A new warehouse in Manchester was built in 1897. This store became the centre of an enterprise that, by then, included thirty-six branches. New stores had been built in Bradford, Leicester, Northampton, Preston, and Swansea. London had a total of seven branches. On 5 May 1897, Marks was naturalised as a British subject.

In 1903, Marks & Spencer became a limited company. Spencer's original £300 investment had grown to a value of £15,000 and he retired later that year. Michael Marks continued to develop the business until his death at Knoll House, 396 Bury New Road, Salford, on 31 December 1907. He was buried in the Old Jewish cemetery (Hebrew Congregation), Crumpsall, in plot number 1917, on 2 January 1908.

In 1928, long after the death of Marks, his son Simon Marks, later the first Baron Marks of Broughton, laid the foundations for a long tradition. He introduced the "St Michael" brand name in honour of his father, which remained in use until 2000.

See  also
List of people from Belarus
List of Poles

References

Bibliography

External links
Marks and Spencer website
Beginnings- M&S Company Archive

Year of birth uncertain
Date of birth unknown
1907 deaths
British people of Polish-Jewish descent
Polish emigrants to the United Kingdom
British businesspeople in retailing
Retail company founders
Belarusian Jews
British Jews
Emigrants from the Russian Empire to the United Kingdom
People from Slonim
People from Grodno Governorate
Marks-Sacher family
19th-century British businesspeople